Rachel Saint (January 2, 1914 – November 11, 1994) was an American evangelical Christian missionary who worked in Ecuador.

Rachel Saint was born in Wyncote, Pennsylvania. She attended the Philadelphia School of the Bible (now Cairn University) and then worked at the Keswick Colony of Mercy in New Jersey.

Career
Saint was sent out by the Wycliffe Bible Translators, trained by Summer Institute of Linguistics (now SIL International). Her first missionary assignment was to the Piro and Shapira in Peru, but she had an interest in the Huaorani in Ecuador. In February 1955, she and Catherine Peeke went to a missionary station near Huaorani territory, where Saint's brother was working. Rachel Saint started learning the Huaorani language with the help of Dayuma, a Huaorani woman who had left her people after a dispute and was sheltered by missionaries.

In January 1956, five missionaries in the area were killed by Huaorani people, including her brother Nate Saint, who had come to Ecuador in 1948. As a result, Saint considered herself spiritually bonded to the tribe.   In 1957, she embarked on a tour of the United States together with Dayuma, appearing with Billy Graham at Madison Square Garden and on Ralph Edwards' television show This Is Your Life.

In the summer of 1958, Saint returned to the Huaorani in Ecuador and, together with Elisabeth Elliot, the wife of James (Jim) Elliot, who had been killed by the Huaorani, continued to evangelize. In February 1959, they were able to move into a Huaorani settlement. Where the five American men had failed to gain entrance into the Huaorani society, these two unarmed women (as well as Elliot's little daughter) were not perceived as a threat. Saint continued in her labor to create a dictionary of the Huaorani language that she had begun before the death of the five missionaries.

Saint also appears in Joe Kane's book, Savages, in which she is criticized for the negative effects her proselytizing allegedly had on the lifestyle of those Huaorani who chose to live in her village.

Saint died in Quito from cancer on November 11, 1994.  She was buried in Toñampare, Ecuador, where she had lived with the Huaorani.

Film
 Trinkets and beads. Documentary, Ecuador/USA 1996, 52 minutes; Director: Chris Walker; Producer: Tony Avirgan. “Chris Walker and Tony Avirgan’s films tells the tragi-comic story of the unlikely links between Maxus – a Texas-based oil company – the 79-year-old Wycliffe Bible Translators missionary Rachel Saint, and the Huaorani people of the Ecuadorian Orient, the most fiercely isolated tribe in the Amazon. First introduced to the Indians by the missionaries, Maxus is guilty of poisoning Huaorani land with its drills and flares and leaking pipelines.”

References

External links
 .

1914 births
1994 deaths
People from Montgomery County, Pennsylvania
American evangelicals
American Protestant missionaries
Female Christian missionaries
Translators of the Bible into indigenous languages of the Americas
Missionary linguists
Evangelicalism in South America
Protestant missionaries in Ecuador
Cairn University alumni
Operation Auca
Deaths from cancer in Ecuador
Women linguists
20th-century translators
20th-century women writers
Women lexicographers
American expatriates in Ecuador
20th-century lexicographers
Female Bible Translators